Paulette Sybil Flint (born 25 November 1953) is a local historian and author in Gladstone, Queensland, Australia and is an independent history columnist for The Observer (Gladstone).

Early life 
Paulette Sybil Flint was born in Gladstone, Queensland in 1953. She was the daughter of Frederick Allan Fohrman (Shop Assistant) and Sybil Beatrice Fohrman, nee Barker. Paulette was educated at Gladstone Central State School and Gladstone State High School and graduated in 1970. Paulette married Raymond Flint (Electrician) in 1973 in Gladstone. They had three children; Dr Nicole Flint in 1979, Megan Lennon (nee Flint) in 1982 and Kate Flint in 1989.

Education and career 
On graduation from Gladstone State High School, Flint won a State Scholarship and then went on to graduate with a Diploma of Teaching (Dip. T) from Kedron Park Teachers College in 1973. Flint taught at Gladstone Central State School and Hamilton Island State School (1986-1988). Flint graduated from Central Queensland University in 1993 with a Bachelor of Education (B.Ed.) and obtained a Graduate Diploma in Local, Family and Applied History from the University of New England (UNE) in 2007. Flint also taught at Toolooa State High School in Gladstone and Benaraby State School in Benaraby. She then transferred to Kin Kora State School, Gladstone, where she taught lower school and acted in the capacity of Key Teacher for the Year 2 Net. Flint attended the Summer School for Teachers in January 2007 which was seen by the Australian Government as a reward for high-achieving teachers. Attendees received a bonus payment. In 2007 she was employed at Kin Kora State School as Special Education Teacher, and was promoted to Head of Department (Head of Special Education Services) at Kin Kora State School, Gladstone. She was employed in this position by Education Queensland. from January 2013 until her retirement in 2015.

Community involvement 
Flint joined the Genealogical Society Gladstone District Incorporated (then known as Genealogical Society of Queensland, Gladstone branch) early in 1992 and has held various management committee positions from 1992–present. She conducts regular Genealogical Workshops for the Genealogical Society, including an annual Beginners’ Workshop. She is a regular guest speaker on the history of the Gladstone Region, or on Genealogy. At the  Gladstone City Library she has spoken on local history via “Words of Wisdom” in March 2016  and on Genealogy in May 2018.  Flint, along with other Genealogical Society volunteers Judy Spencer and Jan Koivunen conducted a walk titled "Tales from Yesteryear" in the Gladstone Cemetery in November 2018.

Flint was employed as a Master Class Teacher for “Our Priceless Past” events at the Gladstone Regional Art Gallery and Museum from 2015-2019. For 21 years, this annual community event has involved students interviewing and writing the life stories of seniors over the age of 70, who have lived in the Gladstone area for over 30 years. The stories are printed in a collectors’ section of The Observer (Gladstone) and are displayed with photos and memorabilia from the seniors at the exhibition at the Gladstone Regional Art Gallery and Museum. In this role, Flint assists school students to interview the seniors and write articles for the exhibition.

Flint is regularly consulted when local history information is sought  and was involved in research for some local mysteries, such as finding the descendants of Reverend John Campbell after his 100-year-old diary was discovered in a charity bin in Gladstone in 2012. Flint assisted in locating living relatives of one of the Australian soldiers who had left graffiti in the Naour tunnels on the Western Front. Gilles Prilaux, a French archaeologist was seeking this information for his book.

Writing 
Commencing in 1994, Flint writes regular articles about the history of the Gladstone Region for the Observer (Gladstone) under the category of “Times Gone By”. These articles are also published by other newspapers in the News Corp Syndicate.

Selected works

Books
What’s in a Name? The stories behind the street names of Gladstone, Queensland, published in December 2009 (HistoryInc)

Articles
 "Times Gone By: 'Tis the season for dancing at balls" (2015)
 "1949 Cyclone" (As published in Gladstone Observer, 2 March 2016)
"Gladstone flashback: Explosions and unforgettable deaths (2018) 
 "Flashback: Reflections of Christmases gone by" (2018) 
 "Times Gone By: Adrift boat in danger of sinking" (2019)

References 

1953 births
Living people
Australian historians
Australian women writers
Central Queensland University alumni